Quillaja saponaria, the soap bark tree or soapbark, is an evergreen tree in the family Quillajaceae, native to warm temperate central Chile. In Chile it occurs from 32 to 40° South Latitude approximately and at up to 2000 m (6500 ft) above sea level. It can grow to 15–20 m (50–65 ft) in height. The tree has thick, dark bark; smooth, leathery, shiny, oval evergreen leaves 3–5 cm long; white star-shaped flowers 15 mm diameter borne in dense corymbs; and a dry fruit with five follicles each containing 10–20 seeds.

Characteristics
The inner bark of Quillaja saponaria can be reduced to powder and employed as a substitute for soap, since it forms a lather with water, owing to the presence of a glycoside saponin, sometimes distinguished as quillaia saponin. It's also applied as an agricultural spray adjuvant. The same, or a closely similar substance, is found in soapwort (Saponaria officinalis), in senega root (Polygala senega) and in sarsaparilla; it appears to be chemically related to digitonin, which occurs in digitalis. The wood is used in cabinetry, and scents derived from the tree are used in perfumes and cosmetics.

Uses

Soap bark tree has a long history of medicinal use with the Andean people who used it as a treatment for various chest problems. It is the source of quillaia, the extract of which is used as a food additive and as an ingredient in pharmaceuticals, personal care products, and fire-fighting foam. It is used as an additive in photographic films and as a foaming agent for drinks. The saponin content of the bark helps to stimulate the production of a more watery mucus in the airways, thus facilitating the removal of phlegm through coughing. The saponins of this tree are also considered to have adjuvant properties for vaccine solutions. QS21 adjuvant is a saponin obtainable from Quillaja saponaria extract.  The Novavax vaccine for COVID-19 uses this adjuvant, the zoster vaccine Shingrix also contains QS21.

Habitat

This tree occurs at altitudes to 2000 metres. The species is drought resistant, and tolerates about −12 °C (10 °F) in its natural habitat. Examples of specific occurrences are in central Chile in the forests of La Campana National Park and Cerro La Campana, in which locales it is associated with the Chilean Wine Palm, Jubaea chilensis. It is often used for reforestation on arid soils. It has been introduced as an ornamental in California. Trees have been acclimatized in Spain but are rarely cultivated there.

Etymology
Quillaja is derived from the Chilean vernacular name for this species, culay.

Saponaria means 'soap-like'.

References

Sources
C. Donoso. 2005. Árboles nativos de Chile. Guía de reconocimiento. Edición 4. Marisa Cuneo Ediciones, Valdivia, Chile. 136p.
Encyclopedia of the Chilean Flora. 2009. Quillaja saponaria
Adriana Hoffmann. 1998. Flora Silvestre de Chile, Zona Central. Edición 4. Fundación Claudio Gay, Santiago. 254p.
C. Michael Hogan. 2008. Chilean Wine Palm: Jubaea chilensis, GlobalTwitcher.com, ed. Nicklas Stromberg
J. Taylor. 1990. The Milder Garden. Dent
Chevallier, Andrew, 1996. The Encyclopedia of Medicinal Plants, Dorling Kindersley, 336p.
Singh, Manmohan, 2007. Vaccine Adjuvants and Delivery Systems, John Wiley & Sons, Hoboken, New Jersey, 457 pp.

External links

Chilean Matorral
Flora of central Chile
Trees of Chile
Trees of Mediterranean climate
Drought-tolerant trees
Medicinal plants
saponaria
Saponaceous plants